Netherlands competed at the 2018 European Championships in Berlin, Germany, and Glasgow, Scotland, from 2 to 12 August 2018 in 6 of 7 sports.

Medallists

|  style="text-align:left; width:75%; vertical-align:top;"|

* Participated in the heats only and received medals.
|  style="text-align:left; width:25%; vertical-align:top;"|

Athletics

References

External links
 European Championships official site 

2018
Nations at the 2018 European Championships
2018 in Dutch sport